1950 in Korea may refer to:
1950 in North Korea
1950 in South Korea